Halogaon is a village in Kamrup district of Assam state of India.

References

Villages in Kamrup district